"Nowhere to Run" is a 1965 pop single by Martha and the Vandellas for the Gordy (Motown) label and is one of the group's signature songs. The song, written and produced by Motown's main production team of Holland–Dozier–Holland, depicts the story of a woman trapped in a bad relationship with a man she cannot help but love.

History
Holland-Dozier-Holland and the Funk Brothers band gave the song a large, hard-driving instrumentation sound similar to the sound of prior "Dancing in the Street" with snow chains used as percussion alongside the tambourine and drums.

Billboard described the song as a "good dance beat piece of material which features a gospel piano and a wailin' vocal."  Cash Box described it as "a hard-driving, fast-moving, raunchy bluesy stomper with a contagious teen-oriented, danceable beat."

Included on their 1965 third album, Dance Party, "Nowhere to Run" hit number eight on the Billboard Pop Singles chart, and number five on the Billboard R&B Singles chart. It also charted in the UK peaking at number twenty-six on the chart. The single release was backed with "Motoring".

This version was ranked #358 on Rolling Stone's list of The 500 Greatest Songs of All Time.

This song is featured in Vinyl, Bringing Out the Dead, Baby Driver and the video game Spec Ops: The Line

Covers
Arnold McCuller made a version of the song for the soundtrack of the movie The Warriors from 1979. It was later utilized again for the video game adaptation in 2005.
 In July 1988, following the success of the film Good Morning Vietnam, the song was re-released in the UK by A&M Records, with James Brown's "I Got You (I Feel Good)" on the flip side. The single spent three weeks on the UK chart reaching its highest position of number 52 by 24 July 1988.
On her 1971 covers album Gonna Take a Miracle, singer-songwriter Laura Nyro performed a version with backing vocals by the group Labelle.

Personnel
Lead vocals by Martha Reeves
Background vocals by Rosalind Ashford & Betty Kelly
Written by Brian Holland, Lamont Dozier and Edward Holland Jr.
Produced by Lamont Dozier and Brian Holland
All instrumentation by the Funk Brothers:
Robert White – guitar 	 
Eddie Willis – guitar
Earl Van Dyke – piano 
Benny Benjamin – drums  	 
James Jamerson – bass guitar 	 
Jack Ashford – percussion, tambourine, vibes
Ivy Jo Hunter – percussion (snow chains)
Russ Conway – trumpet 
Herbert Williams – trumpet 
George Bohanon – trombone 
Paul Riser – trombone 
Henry Cosby – tenor saxophone 
Mike Terry – baritone saxophone

Certifications

References

1965 songs
1965 singles
Songs written by Holland–Dozier–Holland
Song recordings produced by Lamont Dozier
Song recordings produced by Brian Holland
Martha and the Vandellas songs
Grand Funk Railroad songs
Gordy Records singles